"Little Girl Don't You Worry" is a song written and recorded by American R&B singer Jermaine Jackson. It was released as the first single from his 1980 album, Jermaine, in October that same year.

Record World called it a "unique, well-crafted [song with Jermaine's] bold vocal up front with spanking percussion & chorus cushions."

Charts

References

1980 singles
1980 songs
Jermaine Jackson songs
Songs written by Jermaine Jackson